Eusignius was a martyred Roman soldier. He began his military career under the emperor Maximian. Under the reign of Constantine he served as general and was witness to emperor's vision of a cross in the sky symbolizing victory. Eusignius retired from the military after 60 years of service.

Eusignius was present at the martyrdom of St. Basiliscus and is said to have seen angels and Jesus Christ who took Basiliscus up to heaven.

He was beheaded by Julian the Apostate in 362 for denouncing paganism.

Eusiginius is one of the 140 Colonnade saints which adorn St. Peter's Square.

References

252 births
362 deaths
Syrian Christian saints
4th-century Christian martyrs
3rd-century Romans
4th-century Romans
Angelic visionaries